A jig is a type of folk dance.

Jig may also refer to:

Manufacturing
 Jig (tool), a device/frame used to control position or motion
 Jigs, various methods of gravity separation in a coal preparation plant

Sports
 Jig, a fishing lure used in the jigging method of fishing (angling)
 "Jig", a nickname of Scottish footballer Lee McCulloch (born 1978)
 Jig, an unwanted anxious/restless on the spot trotting motion of a horse

Entertainment
 Jig (film), a 2011 British documentary
 Jigs (band), a Swedish band
 Jig, a variant of the children's card game snip snap snorem
 Jay Is Games (J.I.G.), a game review website
 Jig, the goblin protagonist of several fantasy novels by Jim C. Hines
 Jig! was the name of a strategy game for the Newton MessagePad published by Dubl-Click Software in 1991.

Slang
 Jig or Jigging, a verb for the act of truancy
 The Jig is up. Meaning a dishonest action that has been uncovered and will not be continued

Other uses
 Gigue (French), or jig in English, a fast dance movement from the Baroque Suite
 George Cram Cook or Jig Cook (1873-1924), American theatre producer, director, playwright, novelist and poet
 Hurricane Jig (1951), in the Atlantic Ocean
 Jig, one of the sectors of Gold Beach during the World War II Normandy landings
 Jig, the phonetic for the letter J in the Joint Army/Navy Phonetic Alphabet
 jig, ISO 639-3 code for the Jingulu language of Australia

See also
The jig is up (disambiguation)
 Jig (theatre), 'dramatic' or 'farce' jig: a short, comic afterpiece in the playhouses of 16th and 17th century England.
 James D. Ramage (1916-2012), American naval aviator and rear admiral nicknamed "Jig Dog"